The Americas Zone was one of the three zones of the regional Davis Cup competition in 2001.

In the Americas Zone there were four different tiers, called groups, in which teams competed against each other to advance to the upper tier. The top two teams in Group IV advanced to the Americas Zone Group III in 2002. All other teams remained in Group IV.

Participating nations

Draw
 Venue: Cercle Bellevue, Port-au-Prince, Haiti
 Date: 5–11 March

  and  promoted to Group III in 2001.

Results

Panama vs. Eastern Caribbean

Barbados vs. U.S. Virgin Islands

Saint Lucia vs. Haiti

Panama vs. U.S. Virgin Islands

Antigua and Barbuda vs. Barbados

Eastern Caribbean vs. Saint Lucia

Panama vs. Antigua and Barbuda

Eastern Caribbean vs, U.S. Virgin Islands

Haiti vs. Barbados

Antigua and Barbuda vs. Eastern Caribbean

Barbados vs. Saint Lucia

U.S. Virgin Islands vs. Haiti

Panama vs. Saint Lucia

Antigua and Barbuda vs. U.S. Virgin Islands

Eastern Caribbean vs. Haiti

Panama vs. Haiti

Antigua and Barbuda vs. Saint Lucia

Barbados vs. Eastern Caribbean

Panama vs. Barbados

Antigua and Barbuda vs. Haiti

Saint Lucia vs. U.S. Virgin Islands

References

External links
Davis Cup official website

Davis Cup Americas Zone
Americas Zone Group IV